Bivol is a Slavic and Romanian word meaning "ox" or "buffalo". It may refer to:

People
Alina Bivol (born 1996), Russian chess player
Constantin Bivol (1885–1942), Bessarabian politician
Dmitry Bivol (born 1990), Russian boxer
Nicolae Bivol (1882–1940), Moldovan politician
Victor Bivol (born 1977), Moldovan judoka

Other
Bivol.bg, a Bulgarian investigative media

See also